Luis Carlos Cabezas (born March 3, 1986) is a Colombian footballer that plays for Cúcuta Deportivo.

Club career
Luis Carlos was formed in the storied Colombian club's youth system making his debut for the first team during the 2006 season. He plays as a striker and was sub champion of the Copa Mustang in 2006 with Deportivo Cali.  During 2007 he was loaned to second division side Córdoba FC to gain more experience. He ended the campaign as Córdoba FC's leading scorer, tallying nine goals. At the conclusion of the 2007 season Cabezas was recalled by Deportivo Cali.

Luis Carlos transferred to China League One club Dalian Aerbin in July 2011. He signed a three-year-contract with the club. He scored four goals in a league match which Dalian Aerbin beat Hunan Billows 6-2 on October 22, 2011. Luis Carlos scored 6 goals in 11 appearances as Dalian Aerbin won promotion to the top flight for the first time of club's history.

On January 20, 2012, Dalian Aerbin swapped Cabezas with Aidi of China League One side  Shanghai East Asia in a loan deal. He made 27 league appearances and scored 8 goals in the 2012 season, as Shanghai East Asia won the champions and promoted to the top flight. He made a free transfer to Shanghai East Asia on a two-year-deal on February 20, 2013.

On February 26, 2014, Cabezas transferred to China League One side Hunan Billows.

Chinese League career statistics 
(Correct as of October 22, 2016)

Honors
Dalian Aerbin
 China League One: 2011

Shanghai East Asia
 China League One: 2012

References

External links

1986 births
Living people
Colombian footballers
Colombian expatriate footballers
Categoría Primera A players
Venezuelan Primera División players
Bolivian Primera División players
Chinese Super League players
China League One players
Kuwait Premier League players
Deportivo Cali footballers
Monagas S.C. players
Deportivo Pereira footballers
Caracas FC players
Dalian Professional F.C. players
Shanghai Port F.C. players
Hunan Billows players
C.D. Jorge Wilstermann players
Al-Nasr SC (Kuwait) players
La Equidad footballers
Deportivo La Guaira players
Atlético Venezuela C.F. players
Cúcuta Deportivo footballers
Association football forwards
Footballers from Cali
Colombian expatriate sportspeople in China
Colombian expatriate sportspeople in Venezuela
Colombian expatriate sportspeople in Bolivia
Colombian expatriate sportspeople in Kuwait
Expatriate footballers in China
Expatriate footballers in Venezuela
Expatriate footballers in Bolivia
Expatriate footballers in Kuwait